Çameli is a wooded highland district of Denizli Province at the western end of the Taurus Mountains in Turkey.

The highest peak in the district is Akdağ (3213 m). Summers are cool and winters are cold and wet. The area is under snow in winter.

References

External links
 District governor's official website 

Populated places in Denizli Province
Districts of Denizli Province